A mycophycobiosis (composed of myco-, from the Ancient Greek:  (mukês , "mushroom"), phyco-, from Ancient Greek: , (phûkos, fucus, used for algae), and -biose, from ancient Greek:  (bióô, "to spend one's life") is a symbiotic organism made up of a multicellular algae and an ascomycete fungus housed inside the algae (in the thallus for example). The algae and fungus involved in this association are called mycophycobionts.

The essential role of the algae is to carry out photosynthesis, while that of the fungus is less obvious, but it could be linked to the transfer of minerals within the thallus, to a repellent effect on herbivores and, above all, to resistance to desiccation of this living organism in the intertidal zone.

Such symbioses have been reported in a few green algae (Prasiola, Blidingia) and red algae (Apophlaea), both in seawater and in freshwater.

Definition elements

Although compared to lichens by certain authors, mycophycobioses carry out an association of the opposite type: the algal partner is multicellular and forms the external structure of the symbiotic organization. Moreover, the reproduction of the two partners is always disjoint (the algae and the fungus reproduce separately). To explain the nuances of this duality, the ecologists Chantal Delzenne-Van Haluwyn, Michel Lerond propose the analogy of the two symbionts with an "ideal couple". In a lichen, the host is compared to a "macho fungus"; in mycophycobiosis, the host is "the algae that wears the panties".

According to Hawksworth the physiology of this symbiosis could well be comparable to that of lichens, but it remains to be better explored. Unlike lichens, mycophycobioses look like an algal partner, which remains fertile. These associations appear to be less coevolved than lichens, as they exhibit neither joint asexual multiplication of partners nor do they contain the equivalent lichen products.

History

The term mycophycobiosis was introduced by Jan and Erika Kohlmeyer in 1972, based on the case of the brown algal species Ascophyllum nodosum, which regularly harbours the ascomycete Mycosphaerella ascophylli.

Another example of mycophycobiosis occurs in the genus Turgidosculum (synonym: Mastodia), which associates a green alga of the genus Prasiola with an ascomycete pyrenomycete of the genus Kohlmeyera. While the only alga of the genus Prasiola remains subservient to a certain at least temporary marine cover, the mycophycobiotic association allows a more terrestrial conquest outside the intertidal zone.

Some authors hypothesize that vascular plants may have evolved from such a type of association and that this symbiosis may have helped land plants to conquer continents (similar to the association that gave rise to lichens).

Major evolutionary role: exiting the waters

The major groups of carbon phototrophs, prokaryotes and eukaryotes, arose in the marine environment. The establishment of symbioses has made it possible to make a macroevolutionary leap to conquer the more hostile terrestrial environment. Various mutualistic associations (mycophycobioses, lichens, then mycorrhizae) have been simultaneously or successively used.

Examples

In fresh water, the fungus Phaeospora lemaneae grows inside Lemanea fluviatilis.

In the marine environment, the fungus Blodgettia confervoides can associate with several species of Cladophora. The fungus Mycophycias ascophylli associates with Ascophyllum nodosum (black seaweed) or another Fucaceae, Pelvetia canaliculata.

References

Symbiosis
Lichenology